The Global Mobile Satellite System (GMSS) consists of several satellite phone providers serving private customers. It can be compared to PLMN (wireless telephony carriers) and PSTN (traditional wire-based telephony).

As of 2008, ranges of numbers have been assigned to four GMSS carriers:

 Iridium Satellite LLC
 Globalstar
 Ellipso (a non-operational service, with no satellites launched)
 ICO Global Communications

In 1996, the ITU introduced country code +881 for direct international dialing of phones on GMSS providers. (Inmarsat had already been allocated country code +870.) The next digit following the country code is allocated (two at a time) to a particular GMSS carrier:

Satellite numbers outside the GMSS country code 
Inmarsat is a satellite-based communications provider, but it is primarily a maritime service and is not generally considered part of the GMSS.

Globalstar usually allocates subscribers with a local number in the country they are based rather than using their GMSS country code.

Iridium also uses an Arizona-based access number to call Iridium phones for those unwilling or unable to call the usually expensive GMSS number directly.

Thuraya has been assigned +882-16, within the +882 range for International Networks.

References 

Satellite telephony